Kamila Ženatá (born 1953) is a Czech artist, known primarily for her video art and installation works.

Ženatá studied at the Academy of Fine Arts, Prague from 1973 until 1979; there she studied under Ladislav Čepelák. She lives and works in Prague. Two prints by Ženatá are in the collection of the National Gallery of Art.

References

1953 births
Living people
20th-century Czech artists
20th-century Czech women artists
21st-century Czech artists
21st-century Czech women artists
Academy of Fine Arts, Prague alumni